Kumarghat railway station is a small railway station in Unakoti district, Tripura. Its code is KUGT. It serves Kumarghat town. The station consists of two platforms. The platform is not well sheltered. It lacks many facilities including water and sanitation.

Major trains

 Dharmanagar–Agartala Passenger
 Agartala–Silchar Passenger

References

Railway stations in Unakoti district
Lumding railway division